Hendon Park is a 12 hectare London suburban park situated  north west of Charing Cross. It borders the Northern line, and Hendon Park and Northern line Railway Cutting are a Site of Local Importance for Nature Conservation.

 It also has an outdoor gym,(added in 2016) a playground, a café, and a stairway-bridge connecting the park near to Brent Cross.

The park also offers tennis and basketball courts as well, and contains approximately 4-5 entrances from different areas of the park.

The park is also protected by the London Borough of Barnet, and is situated between Hendon, Brent Cross, and 2 bus stops via 83!

History

Hendon Park was part of a medieval estate known as the Steps Fields and owned by the Goodyer family.  From 1868 till 1903 it was owned by the Kemp family when Hendon Council opened the park to the public.

The borough of Hendon became part of the larger London Borough of Barnet in April 1965. The park has a Holocaust Memorial Garden, which contains a pond, many plants and is enclosed by large hedges. The Children’s Millennium Wood planted in 2000 is a native tree and grassland area, which will provide a good habitat for birds when it matures. The rest of the park is mainly informal parkland, with mown grass and mature trees, especially London plane and lime. It is a good spot for watching pipistrelle bats on a summer evening.

The landscape includes one of the largest specimens of Japanese maple in London and was recognised as one of the Great Trees of London in 2008. Many mature trees survive from the original planting, despite damage caused by the Great Storm of 1987 during which many trees were uprooted and destroyed.

Hendon Park during World War II

"Rout the Rumour", a large propaganda rally was held in Hendon Park on Sunday, 21 July 1940. The rally included songs, music and sketches. It was intended to promote the idea that gossip and rumour harmed the war effort.

The Hendon Park cafe was originally a bomb shelter, and is a single storey, lead lined, solid brick built building under a flat roof.

Local transport links

Bus routes:
 83, 113, 143, 186, 326, 643 and 797 all pass nearby

Underground

 Station: Hendon Central
 Tube Line: Northern line, Edgware branch
 Distance: Two minutes walk

Green Flag award

The park was awarded the Green Flag Award in 2009-10

See also

 Barnet parks and open spaces
 Nature reserves in Barnet

Notes

Further reading

Nature reserves in the London Borough of Barnet
Parks and open spaces in the London Borough of Barnet